Gentianella is a plant genus in the gentian family (Gentianaceae). Plants of this genus are known commonly as dwarf gentians.

 there were about 256 species in this genus. They are herbs that occur in alpine and arctic habitat types. They are distributed in the Americas, Eurasia, northern Africa, Australia, and New Zealand.

Selected species
Gentianella alborosea – Hercampuri; Peru
Gentianella amarella – Autumn gentian, felwort; Northern Europe, United States, Canada
Gentianella anglica – Early gentian; Great Britain
Gentianella androsacea Ecuador
Gentianella anisodonta Europe (Austria,Switzerland, Italy, Slovenia, Croatia and Turkey.
Gentianella antarctica
Gentianella auriculata
 Gentianella austriaca  Eastern Switzerland, Austria
 Gentianella aspera Austria
Gentianella barringtonensis – Barrington snow gentian; New South Wales
Gentianella bellidifolia New Zealand
Gentianella bulgarica
Gentianella campestris – Field gentian; northern, central and southern Europe
Gentianella cerina – Giant gentian; New Zealand
Gentianella cernua Ecuador
Gentianella ciliata – Fringed gentian
Gentianella concinna New Zealand
Gentianella crassulifolia Ecuador
Gentianella fastigiata Ecuador
Gentianella flaviflora Ecuador
Gentianella foliosa Ecuador
Gentianella fuscicaulis Ecuador
Gentianella germanica – Chiltern gentian, German gentian; UK and Europe
Gentianella gilioides Ecuador
Gentianella gracilis Ecuador
Gentianella heterosepala – Autumn gentian
Gentianella hirculus Ecuador
Gentianella hypericoides Ecuador
Gentianella hyssopifolia Ecuador
Gentianella jamesonii Ecuador
Gentianella limoselloides Ecuador
Gentianella longibarbata Ecuador
Gentianella lutescens Europe (Carpathians) 
Gentianella microcalyx
Gentianella nitida Peru
Gentianella oellgaardii Ecuador
Gentianella patula
Gentianella polyantha Ecuador
Gentianella praecox Germany, Austria, Czech Republic and Poland  
Gentianella profusa Ecuador
Gentianella propinqua 
Gentianella quinquefolia – Agueweed; eastern North America
Gentianella rupicola Ecuador
Gentianella saxifragoides Ecuador
Gentianella scopulorum – Charleston gentian
Gentianella spenceri
Gentianella splendens Ecuador
Gentianella sulphurea Ecuador
Gentianella tenella – Slender gentian
Gentianella tortuosa 
Gentianella uliginosa – Dune gentian; Europe
Gentianella wislizeni 
Gentianella wrightii

Description

Vegetative characteristics 
Gentianella-species grow as one- to two-year-old or more rarely perennial herbaceous plants. The stem leaves are arranged cross-wise or more rarely whorled in ground leaf rosettes or distributed on the stem. The leaf blades are simple. Plants range from 3–100 cm in height.

Generative characteristics 
Flowers end up individually or in a cymose inflorescence with double flower envelope.
The hermaphrodite flowers are 0.5–5 cm long, have four or five petals with entire petal margins, displaying radial symmetry. 
They have one or two naked nectaries per petal lobe on the upper petal surface. 

The four or five sepals have grown together. There is no connective skin in the calyx (unlike many in the Gentian family). The four or five sepals are fused in a tubular or funnel shape, but unlike with many Gentiana-types, no fold-flaps (plicae) are present between the corolla-tips. Appendages may be absent or present as fringed scales at the corolla-leaf-base. There are nectaries at the base of the corolla tube, the length of which varies considerably, and which is variously colored. Some have a ring of vascularized or non-vascularized fimbriae in the corolla throat. 
There is only one circle with four or five stamens, which are inserted at the corolla tube and do not protrude from it. The stylus is short to absent.

The two-lobed capsule (fruit) contains many seeds with a smooth to warty surface.

Distribution
Most Gentianella'''-species are native to South America. In addition, species occur in the Temperate Zones of New Zealand, Australia, Asia, Europe, North America and northwestern Africa.

Taxonomy
The genus Gentianella was introduced in 1794 by Conrad Moench in Methodus Plantas Horti Botanici et Agri Marburgensis : a staminum situ describendi. The genus name Gentianella is a diminutive and means directly translated "Little Gentian". synonym for Gentianella (Moench) are: Aliopsis (Omer & Qaiser), Aloitis (Raf.), Arctogentia (Á. Löve), Chionogentias (L.G.Adams), Parajaeschkea (Burkill), Pitygentias (Gilg), Selatium (G. Don).

The genus Gentianella belongs to the subtribe Swertiinae from the tribe Gentianeae within the family of Gentians (Gentianaceae).

In the past, Gentianella were added to the genus gentians (Gentiana), but these two genera belong to different subtribe today. The clearest distinguishing feature is that in all Gentianella species native to Central Europe, a fringed scale supplied with guide bundles per each petal tip is present in the throat of the corolla. This resembles a wreath (which is why it is called "wreath gentian" in German).
 
Also, Gentianopsis'' with their fringed corolla-ends and hair-ends ('Comastoma') which are likewise fringed, but have anatomically differently constructed pharyngeal scales, were later separated of the Gentinellas.

References

External links

 
Gentianaceae genera